Jordan Rhys Hall (born August 31, 1984) is a Canadian lacrosse player from Surrey, British Columbia who plays for the Rochester Knighthawks in the National Lacrosse League and the Hamilton Nationals of Major League Lacrosse.

College career
Hall attended University of Delaware, where he played alongside Alex Smith to help the Blue Hens reach the 2007 NCAA Division I Men's Final Four.  In 2006, he was named Colonial Athletic Association Player of the Year.

Professional career
Hall was selected in the first round (first overall) by the New York Titans of the National Lacrosse League in the 2007 NLL Entry Draft.  A lacrosse scout said that Hall was "the most NLL-ready player in the draft". Hall was awarded "Rookie of the Month" honors in March of the 2008 NLL season. Hall also joined the Rochester Rattlers of Major League Lacrosse midseason from Chicago, helping the team to its first MLL title in 2008.

During the 2009 NLL season, he was named a reserve to the All-Star game.

Hall played two years in New York and moved with the team to Orlando, where he played one more year before the team disbanded. Hall was picked up by the Rochester Knighthawks in the dispersal draft. After two years in Rochester, Hall was traded to the Philadelphia Wings as part of a blockbuster deal involving Paul Rabil and Dan Dawson.  Two years later Hall would find himself back with the Rochester Knighthawks when the newly named New England Black Wolves traded him to Rochester for the 11th and 28th overall picks in 2014, as well as a 2015 1st round pick.

Hall also plays summer box lacrosse in his native British Columbia with the New Westminster Salmonbellies of the Western Lacrosse Association.  In 2006, he was named the winner of the league's Ed Bailey Trophy as the year's top rookie.

Statistics

University of Delaware

MLL

NLL

Awards

See also
University of Delaware Mens Lacrosse

References

1984 births
Living people
Canadian lacrosse players
Delaware Fightin' Blue Hens men's lacrosse players
Major League Lacrosse players
National Lacrosse League All-Stars
National Lacrosse League major award winners
New York Titans (lacrosse) players
Orlando Titans players
Philadelphia Wings players
Rochester Knighthawks players
Sportspeople from Surrey, British Columbia
Hamilton Nationals players